The cabinet of Salvador Sánchez Cerén formed on 1 June 2014 to serve as President Salvador Sánchez Cerén's cabinet from 1 June 2014 until 1 June 2019.

Ministers

See also 

 Salvador Sánchez Cerén

References 

Cabinets established in 2014
Cabinets disestablished in 2019
2014 establishments in El Salvador
2019 disestablishments in El Salvador